Curvy Widow is a 2016 musical comedy based on a true story with music and lyrics by Drew Brody and a book by Bobby Goldman.

Production
The musical is directed by Peter Flynn, with choreography by Marcos Santana.

North Carolina production
The world premiere of Drew Brody and Bobby Goldman's Curvy Widow the Musical opened at North Carolina Stage Company in November 2016.

George Street Playhouse Production
Prior to their Off-Broadway debut, the musical opened at George Street Playhouse early May 2017 in New Brunswick, New Jersey.

Off-Broadway production
The musical started previews in July 2017 and officially opened Off-Broadway in August 2017 at Westside Theatre.

Songs

"Under Control" - Bobby, Jim, and Ensemble 
"Turn the Page" - Bobby 
"White Box Loft" - Shrink, Bobby, and Ensemble 
"Age Height Weight" - Bobby 
"Curvy Widow" - Bobby 
"A New Hand" - Bobby and Mort 
"It's Not a Match" - Bobby, Heidi, Caroline, Joan and the Men 
"Curvy Widow (reprise)" - Bobby 
"Log On, Get Off" - Ensemble 
"The Rules for Whittling Down" - Bobby 
"Gynecologist Tango" - Bobby, Caroline, Heidi, and Ensemble 
"Looking For" - The Men 
"Lying on the Bathroom Floor" - Bobby 
"Looking For (reprise)" - The Men 
"The One" - Joan, Caroline, and Heidi
"What More Do You Need?" - Per Se and Bobby 
"Why Stop Here?" - Bobby and Ensemble 
"In Her Sites" - Ensemble and Bobby

Original casts

Critical Reception

The New York Times's Anita Gates wrote, "I wish I had Bobby Goldman’s faith that New York is filled with attractive, charming, emotionally stable older men looking for relationships." Suzanna Bowling from Times Square Chronicles wrote, "Nancy Opel, pulls a tour de force, as she embodies the Curvy Widow upstairs at the Westside Theatre. This musical is sure to beat Menopause, as the most popular and highest grossing show in town. Critics were not in love when they saw Menopause, but the authors laugh all the way to the bank. Well move over, because Curvy Widow is bound to surpass that fad."

References

2016 musicals
Musicals inspired by real-life events
Off-Broadway musicals
Plays set in New York City